Stuck in This Ocean is the debut album by the Manchester band Airship, released 5 September 2011 on PIAS Records.

Track listing 
 Algebra
 Invertebrate
 Kids
 Gold Watches
 Spirit Party
 The Trial Of Mr Riddle
 Organ 
 Test
 Vampires
 This Is Hell
 Stuck In This Ocean

References

2011 debut albums
PIAS Recordings albums